A list of films produced in France in 2007.

External links
 2007 in France
 2007 in French television
 French films of 2007 at the Internet Movie Database
French films of 2007 at Cinema-francais.fr

2007
Films
French